Archaeological illustration is a form of technical illustration that records material derived from an archaeological context graphically.

Overview 
Archaeological Illustration encompasses a number of sub disciplines. These are:

 Surveying: To produce an accurate record of sites and buildings and to record accurately where the sites and buildings lie within the landscape. Surveyors use a range of equipment including tapes, plane tables, total stations, 3D scanners, GPS and GIS to produce illustrations including plans, sections and elevations as well as isometric and axonometric illustrations which are regularly used in building recording. Survey data will be gathered on acid free paper, polyvinyl permatrace and archive stable digital formats.
 Photography: To produce a record of archaeological sites, buildings, artifacts and landscapes. Archaeological photographers will uses a range of different formats particularly black-and-white and colour slide. Digital photography is now starting to become more widely used and is especially useful for the recording of historic building. Aerial photography is commonly used as a tool for recording sites and is also used as a prospecting tool to locate new archaeological sites.
 Artefact illustration: To record objects using agreed conventions to allow further study of the objects by specialists on publication. Artefact illustrators will use pen-and-ink as well as graphics and page layout software.
 Interpretation and reconstruction illustration: To visualise the results of archaeological field work in a way that is meaningful and visually appealing to as many as possible.  Reconstruction artists work in many media from traditional pen-and-ink and painted reconstruction to more modern techniques including 3D, virtual reality and video.

See also
 Archaeological field survey
 Archaeological plan
 Archaeological record
 Archaeological section
 Excavation (archaeology)
 M. Louise Baker (archaeological illustrator)
 Post excavation
 Training excavation

References

Further reading 
 Philip Barker (1977). Techniques of Archaeological Excavation, Batsford
 Adkins, L. and Adkins, R.A (1989). Cambridge Manuals in Archaeology: Archaeological Illustration Cambridge University Press
 John Hodgson (2000). Archaeological reconstruction: illustrating the past, AAI&S & IFA
 Griffiths, N. Jenner, A. and Wilson, C. (2002). Drawing Archaeological Finds: A Handbook Archetype
 Melanie Steiner (2005). Approaches to Archaeological Illustration: A Handbook, Council for British Archaeology
 The MoLAS archaeological site manual MoLAS, London 1994.

External links

 The Chartered Institute for Archaeologists
 The Graphics Archaeology Group of the IfA
 www.smallfindsdesign.co.uk/workshop.html  An online demonstration of how an archaeological illustrator goes about their work.

Methods in archaeology
Drawing
Technical drawing
Infographics